"She's Got the Rhythm (And I Got the Blues)" is a song co-written by American country music artists Alan Jackson and Randy Travis, and performed by Jackson.  It was released in October 1992 as the first single from his album A Lot About Livin' (And a Little 'bout Love).  The song received an award in 1993 from Music City News for being one of the most performed country songs of the year.

Content
The song is an R&B-inspired tune that Jackson and Travis wrote while on tour together in 1991. They planned to pitch the song to B.B. King to record but Jackson decided to take it and record instead.

Critical reception
Leeann Ward of Country Universe gave the song an A grade," saying that it "showcases production that still sounds vibrant almost twenty years later" and the song has "steel guitar and honky tonk piano aplenty." She goes on to say that the song’s "concept is accentuated by its clever title and Jackson’s amusingly mournful delivery, including a pitiful 'yee haw' that ends up sounding more funny than sad, which ultimately describes the song as a whole, despite the theme of lost love."

Music video
The video was directed by Jim Shea and was released in October 1992.

Chart positions
"She's Got the Rhythm (And I Got the Blues)" debuted at number 42 on the  U.S. Billboard Hot Country Singles & Tracks for the week of October 24, 1992.

Year-end charts

References

1992 singles
Alan Jackson songs
Songs written by Alan Jackson
Songs written by Randy Travis
Song recordings produced by Keith Stegall
Arista Nashville singles
1992 songs